Billboard Top Rock'n'Roll Hits: 1973 is a compilation album released by Rhino Records in 1989, featuring ten hit recordings from 1973.

All tracks on the album reached the top 3 on the Billboard Hot 100, with eight of the songs going to No. 1 on the chart.

Track listing

Billboard Top Rock'n'Roll Hits albums
1989 compilation albums
Pop rock compilation albums